Acontia crocata is a moth of the family Noctuidae. It is found from India to Australia. In 2003, it was recorded from Deux-Sèvres in France.

The wingspan is about 20 mm. Adults have dark-brown forewings. The male has white patches on the costa, while the female has an orange basal area. The hindwings are brown with orange basal areas.

The larvae feed on Ligustrum vulgare.

References

External links
Australian Faunal Directory
Australian Insects

crocata
Moths of Asia
Moths of Australia
Moths of Europe
Moths described in 1852